Look Around is the first full-length album by American actor/singer Anthony Rapp, known as a singer for his performance as Mark Cohen in the musical Rent and the film adaptation of the musical. It was released on October 1, 2000.

Track listing
"Living Alive" – 3:48 (Pisapia & Rapp)
"Look Around" – 3:52 (Pisapia & Rapp)
"Then Again" – 2:42 (Rapp)
"Human Tornado" – 2:35 (Keaney & Rapp)
"Always" – 4:06 (Keaney & Rapp)
"Just Some Guy" – 4:03 (Pisapia & Rapp)
"Goodbye" – 2:35 (Pisapia & Rapp)
"Room To Breathe" – 4:15 (Blum & Safran)
"Lesson #1" – 4:06 (Marshall Crenshaw)
"Visits To You" – 4:23 (Pisapia & Rapp)
"Out Out Damn Spot" – 4:14 (Pisapia)
"Now I Know" – 5:45 (Rapp)

Credits

Tracks 1–6, 8, 12
 Vocals – Anthony Rapp
 Guitar – Joe McMahan
 Bass – David Jacques
 Drums – Jimmy Lester

Additional musicians
 John Keaney – Guitar on 1, 3, 4, & 5, and piano 3, 5 & 8
 Michael Corbett – Keyboards on 5 & 12, Organ on 4
 Keith Lowen – backing vocals on 4 & 7
 Eric Fritsch – Guitar on 1, 3 & 12
 Joe Pisapia – Guitar on 2 & 6, back vocals on 4, 6, & 7
 Adam Blum – Guitar on 8
 David Henry – Cello on 5 & 8
 John Painter – Flugelhorn on 2 & 6
 Sam Smith – Drums on 3

Tracks 7, 9, 10, 11
 Guitar, Keyboards, Lap Steel, and Vibes – Joe Pisapia
 Bass – James "Hags" Haggerty
 Drums – Marc Pisapia

Additional musicians
 David Henry – Cello on 10
 Katie Cook, Allison Pierce, & Catherine Pierce – Backing Vocals on 11

About the CD
Look Around is Anthony Rapp's first CD.

About the Songs
A few of the songs deal with the death of Rapp's mother including "Always", and "Visits to You".

About the Music Video
There is a music video of "Out Out Damn Spot". It can be viewed when the CD is put in a computer.

References

2000 debut albums